Oliva mantichora, common name the amethyst olive, is a species of sea snail, a marine gastropod mollusk in the family Olividae, the olives.

Subspecies
 Oliva mantichora intricata Dautzenberg, 1927
 Oliva mantichora mantichora Duclos, 1840

Description
The length of the shell varies between 25 mm and 53 mm.

Distribution
This marine species occurs in the Western Indian Ocean to Japan and New Guinea.

References

 Steyn, D.G & Lussi, M. (2005). Offshore Shells of Southern Africa: A pictorial guide to more than 750 Gastropods. Published by the authors. Pp. i–vi, 1–289
 Tursch B., Germain L. & Greifeneder D. (1986). Studies on Olividae. IV. Oliva annulata Gmelin, 1791 (of authors): a confusion of species. Indo-Malayan Zoology. 3: 189-216.
 Vervaet F.L.J. (2018). The living Olividae species as described by Pierre-Louis Duclos. Vita Malacologica. 17: 1-111

External links
 Gastropods com: Oliva (Annulatoliva) annulata annulata mantichora (f)

mantichora
Gastropods described in 1840